The Georgia Voice is an LGBT-oriented bi-weekly newspaper based in Atlanta, Georgia. The paper updates online daily and produces a print edition every two weeks.  The newspaper debuted on March 19, 2010.

The paper is the result of the financial collapse of Window Media in November 2009.  With the closure of Window Media, Atlanta lost its primary LGBT newspaper, Southern Voice.  The founder and editor of that paper got together to form a new company and paper, The Georgia Voice. Six of the original seven staff members were former employees of Southern Voice before its closure under parent company Window Media.

References

External links
 Georgia Voice official website

LGBT-related newspapers published in the United States
Newspapers published in Atlanta
LGBT culture in Atlanta
Newspapers established in 2009